Andrea Hlaváčková and Lucie Hradecká were the defending champions, but lost in the semifinals to Maria Kirilenko and Nadia Petrova.

Sara Errani and Roberta Vinci won the tournament, defeating Kirilenko and Petrova in the final 4–6, 6–4, 6–2.

Seeds

Draw

Finals

Top half

Section 1

Section 2

Bottom half

Section 3

Section 4

References
 Main Draw
2012 French Open – Women's draws and results at the International Tennis Federation

Women's Doubles
French Open - Women's Doubles
French Open by year – Women's doubles
2012 in women's tennis
2012 in French women's sport